Pailitas is a town and municipality in the Colombian Department of Cesar.

References

External links
 Pailitas official website

Municipalities of Cesar Department